This is a list of players with international caps in the TT Pro League that began league play in 1999. The following players must have received at least one full international cap by their respective national team's first squad while playing in the TT Pro League. However, players who earned their first international cap after leaving the Pro League are not included. Appearances and goals are composed of FIFA World Cup and CONCACAF Gold Cup matches and each competition's required qualification matches, as well as numerous international friendly tournaments and matches.

The first TT Pro League players to have received a full international cap were Clayton Ince of Defence Force, Hector Sam of San Juan Jabloteh, Derek King of W Connection, and Joe Public's Lyndon Andrews, Shurland David, Arnold Dwarika, Kerwin Jemmott, Sherwyn Julien, and Stokely Mason, who represented Trinidad and Tobago in a 2–0 win against South Africa at the National Stadium on 6 May 1999. Densill Theobald is the Pro League's most capped player, appearing in 91 games for Trinidad and Tobago during his playing career in the Pro League. Nigel Pierre is the top international goal scorer while playing in the Pro League, netting 20 goals for the Soca Warriors.

There have been twelve TT Pro League international players who have represented their respective national team in the FIFA World Cup. However, the first international players to appear at the FIFA World Cup while playing in the Pro League were Cyd Gray and Aurtis Whitley. The San Juan Jabloteh duo represented Trinidad and Tobago in a 0–0 draw against Sweden in the Soca Warriors opening match at the 2006 FIFA World Cup.

International call-ups during the earliest years of the TT Pro League were generally for Trinidad and Tobago, however, players representing the surrounding Caribbean nations of Guyana, Saint Lucia, and Saint Vincent and the Grenadines also received full international caps. From the 2000s onward, the increasingly multinational nature of the Pro League resulted in call-ups for players from across North and Central America, and around the Caribbean (including Antigua and Barbuda, Jamaica, and Saint Kitts and Nevis) and also from Africa (Botswana).

List of international players
Years in TT Pro League listed are those for which the player has played at least one Pro League game and seasons for those in which the player has played at least one Pro League game. Note that seasons, not calendar years, are used. For example, "2010–13" indicates that the player has played in every season from 2010–11 to 2012–13, but not necessarily every calendar year from 2010 to 2013. Therefore, a player beginning with the 2010–11 season should always have a listing under at least two years — for instance, a player making his debut in 2011, during the 2011–12 season, will have "2011–12" in the Years in TT Pro League.

Current TT Pro League players
On this table is a list of TT Pro League international players who have played at least one Pro League game in the current season (2013–14), and the clubs they've played for. The list includes players who have subsequently left the club, but do not include current players of a Pro League club who have not played a Pro League game in the current season.

Details correct as of end of 2013–14 season. Next update will remove all international players from withdrawn teams and that have left their clubs from current status, and add newly admitted teams' international players that have received at least one full international cap while in the Pro League. This will be undertaken on the first day of the 2014–15 season in September 2014.

Former TT Pro League players
On this table is a list of former TT Pro League players who have been capped by their respective national team while playing in the Pro League. The list includes current international players that have either subsequently left the Pro League or have not played at least one Pro League game in the current season (2013–14).

 

International players by nationality

See also
 List of foreign TT Pro League players
 List of foreign TT Pro League goalscorers

NotesPlayersNational teams'

References

External links
 National Football Teams
 Caribbean Football Database
 Soca Warriors Online, Player Directory

inter
Association football player non-biographical articles